Anne Smith, Lady Smith,  (born 16 March 1955) is a Scottish lawyer, and a judge of the Supreme Courts of Scotland.

Early life
Smith was educated at Jordanhill School and Cheadle County Grammar School for Girls, before attending the School of Law of the University of Edinburgh, where she graduated with an LL.B. (Hons.). She served a two-year apprenticeship with Shepherd and Wedderburn WS, and was admitted to the Faculty of Advocates in 1980.

Legal career

Smith worked as Standing Junior Counsel to the Countryside Commission, before becoming a Queen's Counsel in 1993.

She served as a Temporary Sheriff from 1995 to 1999, as Chairman of the Scottish Partnership on Domestic Abuse from 1998 to 2000, and as an Advocate Depute from 2000 to 2001.  In April 2001 she was blamed by Donald Findlay QC for falling dress standards in the courts. In 1997, she had been the first woman to appear before the Court of Session in trousers; Findlay said that "The drop in standards began when female lawyers were allowed to wear trousers in court. They are all right for going to Tesco in, but not suitable dress for ladies to wear in court."
In November 2001, Smith was appointed a judge of the Court of Session and High Court of Justiciary, the Supreme Courts of Scotland, taking the judicial title, Lady Smith. Filling the vacancy created by Lord Gill's promotion to Lord Justice Clerk, she was only the third woman to be appointed to the College of Justice.

Controversies

Smith was appointed as chairwoman of the Scottish Child Abuse Inquiry in July 2016; since February 2017 she has been the sole member of the panel. In 2019, a disability discrimination employment claim was made against Smith at the Scottish Child Abuse Inquiry. The allegation was that Smith discriminated, harassed and victimised a junior advocate of the Inquiry when he was diagnosed with cancer, undergoing surgery, during chemotherapy and thereafter to date. Smith denied the allegations. The claim was later withdrawn due to fear of costs. On 23 February 2022, an appeal court held that Smith was acting beyond her powers to prevent the BBC from fully reporting on the disability discrimination employment claim against Smith. An order restricting reporting detail of the claim was issued by the Scottish Child Abuse Inquiry and then challenged by the BBC, first through a judicial review and then an appeal of that review decision. 

The Scottish Child Abuse Inquiry has been criticised for the limited scope of investigations, mounting costs, and delay.

Personal life
Smith married David Alexander Smith, WS, a solicitor, in 1979, with whom she has a son and a daughter.

References

External links
 profile at Judiciary of Scotland website

1955 births
Living people
Members of the Faculty of Advocates
Alumni of the University of Edinburgh
Members of the Privy Council of the United Kingdom
Smith
Scottish women judges
Scottish King's Counsel
20th-century King's Counsel